Dorrington may refer to:

Places
Dorrington, California, a census-designated place in Calaveras County, California
Dorrington, Shropshire, a village in Shropshire
Dorrington Lane a hamlet in northeast Shropshire
Dorrington, Lincolnshire, a village in Lincolnshire
It may also refer to Doddington, Northumberland, sometimes known as Dorrington.

People
Albert Dorrington (1871-1953), British writer
Annie Dorrington (1866-1926), Australian painter
Art Dorrington (b. 1930), ice hockey player
Charles Dorrington, Canadian Anglican bishop
Graham Dorrington, English aeronautical engineer
Grant Dorrington (b. 1948), football administrator
Jack Dorrington (1881-1944), English football goalkeeper
Joe Dorrington, English football goalkeeper
Paul Dorrington, English guitarist
Theophilus Dorrington (1654-1715), Church of England clergyman
William Dorrington (died 1718) English army officer and Jacobite
William E. Dorrington (1852-1926), railway manager